The 2004 Copa do Brasil Finals was a two-legged Brazilian football that determinate the 2004 Copa do Brasil champion. It was played on June 24 and 30. It was contested by Santo André, the 2003 Copa Estado de São Paulo winners and 2003 Campeonato Brasileiro Série C runners-up, and Flamengo, whose last success had come in the 2001 Campeonato Carioca.

Santo André won the finals by a 4–2 aggregate scoreline.

Road to the Finals

First leg

Second leg

See also
2004 Campeonato Brasileiro Série A

References

2004
Copa do Brasil Finals
Copa do Brasil 2004
Copa do Brasil 2004